Andher Nagri is a play written by Indian Hindi writer Bhartendu Harishchandra in 1881. In this 6-act play, with satire, he has shown a king destroyed by his own deeds by an irrational and autocratic government system. Bhartendu composed it in a single day for the Hindu National Theater in Banaras.

Story 
This play is divided into 6 acts.

In the first act, the Mahanta appears with two of his disciples who send their disciples Govardhan Das and Narayan Das to beg for alms in a nearby town. He warns Govardhan Das about the bad consequences of greed.
The second act, has a view of the city market where everything is being sold. Govardhan Das is delighted to see this infidelity in the market and returns to his guru with three and a half sers of sweets for seven paise.
In the third act, the two disciples return to the Mahant. Narayan Das brings nothing while Gobardhan Das brings two and a half ser sweets.  The Mahant becomes conscious on hearing the news of the virtuous and the demerit getting the same sentiment in the city and asks his disciples to leave the city immediately. He says-
"So son, living in this city is not suitable where veggies and sweets are available at Takke Ser. I will not stay in this city any more."
Narayan Das agrees to them while Govardhan Das decides to stay there in the greed of cheap tasty food.
The fourth act, depicts the court and justice of Chaupat Raja of Andher Nagari.  The king, who is drowned in alcohol, starts from the bania on the complaint of the complainant's goat being buried, reaches the Kotwal through the artisan, chunawalla, bhishti, butcher and shepherd and sentences him to death.
In the fifth act, Govardhan Das, who is fat eating sweets and being pleased, is caught by four soldiers and  they take them to the gallows.  They tell him that because the goat died, someone must be hanged for the sake of justice.  When the noose of the gallows came out from the neck of the thin Kotwal, the king ordered to hang a fat man.
In the sixth act, preparations have been completed to hang Govardhan Das in the crematorium.  Then his Guru Mahant Ji comes and gives some mantra in his ear.  After this, both the guru and disciple show their haste to climb the gallows.  The king on hearing that the person who is going to be hanged in this auspicious position will go straight to Baikunth and ultimately orders himself to be hanged. In this way the unjust and foolish king is automatically destroyed.

Characters 
 Mahant – a monk
 Govardhan Das – Mahant's greedy disciple
 Narayan Das – the second disciple of the Mahant
 kebabwala - kebab seller
 Ghasiram : gram seller
 Narangiwali – orange seller
 confectioner – sweet seller
 Kuzdin – vegetable seller
 Mughal – seller of nuts and fruits
 Pachakwala – Churan seller
 fish seller
 Jaatwala – Brahmin
 merchant
 Raja – quadruple king
 Mantri – Minister of Chaupat Raja
 gardener
 Two servants, two servants of the king
 complainant – one who seeks justice from the king
 Kallu – the bania whose wall collapsed and killed the complainant's goat
 Artisan – Wall maker of Kallu Baniya
 Chunewala – a lime maker
 Bhishti – one who wets lime for building walls
 Kasai – the maker of masks for Bhishti
 Shepherd – one who sells sheep to the butcher
 police officer 
 Four Sipahis – The King's Soldiers

See also 
Satya Harishchandra (1965 Kannada film)

References

External links

 Andheri Nagri – Read full drama on Hindi time
 Andheri Nagari – Bharatendu – Bharatkosh

Indian plays
Hindi-language plays